Gerald Corcoran (November 15, 1893 – February 3, 1981) was an American football player and owner. He was a running back for the Columbus Panhandles in 1917. He was the owner of the Cleveland Indians in 1931 and was also the owner of the Los Angeles Bulldogs for 11 seasons.

References

1893 births
1981 deaths
Columbus Panhandles players